The Fox Creek Range is a mountain range in Elko County, Nevada, United States. It is mostly contained within the Jarbidge Ranger District of the Humboldt-Toiyabe National Forest.   The range is considered to be a sub-range of the Jarbidge Mountains.

References 

Mountain ranges of Nevada
Mountain ranges of Elko County, Nevada